The 2013 German Darts Championship was the sixth of eight PDC European Tour events on the 2013 PDC Pro Tour. The tournament took place at Halle 39 in Hildesheim, Germany, between 6–8 September 2013. It featured a field of 64 players and £100,000 in prize money, with £20,000 going to the winner.

Dave Chisnall won his first European Tour title by defeating Peter Wright 6–2 in the final.

Prize money

Qualification
The top 32 players from the PDC ProTour Order of Merit on the 11 June 2013 automatically qualified for the event. The remaining 32 places went to players from three qualifying events - 20 from the UK Qualifier (held in Crawley on 21 June), eight from the European Qualifier and four from the Host Nation Qualifier (both held at the venue in Hildesheim on 5 September).

James Wade was replaced by an additional European qualifier, due to a PDC-banning after the draw. Phil Taylor withdrew and was replaced by an additional Host Nation qualifier.

1–32

UK Qualifier
  David Pallett (first round)
  Steve Brown (third round)
  Terry Temple (first round)
  James Richardson (first round)
  Darren Webster (second round)
  Michael Smith (first round)
  Dean Winstanley (first round)
  John Scott (first round)
  Alan Tabern (first round)
  Matt Clark (first round)
  John Henderson (first round)
  Dennis Smith (second round)
  Matthew Edgar (second round)
  Kevin Dowling (first round)
  Darren Johnson (first round)
  Daryl Gurney (quarter-finals)
  Michael Barnard (first round)
  Nigel Heydon (first round)
  Mark Dudbridge (second round)
  Ricky Evans (first round)

European Qualifier
  Jelle Klaasen (third round)
  Magnus Caris (first round)
  Vincent van der Voort (third round)
  Maik Langendorf (first round)
  Roland Scholten (first round)
  Ronny Huybrechts (first round)
  Jerry Hendriks (first round)
  Michael Rasztovits (first round)
  Richard van Zijtveld (first round)

Host Nation Qualifier
  Adrian Kazimierz (first round)
  Michael Hurtz (second round)
  Tomas Seyler (first round)
  Max Hopp (second round)
  Jyhan Artut (second round)

Draw

References

German Darts Championship
2013 PDC European Tour
2013 in German sport
Sport in Hildesheim